Alberto Gómez may refer to:
Alberto Gómez (Argentine footballer) (born 1950), Argentine midfielder
Alberto Gómez (Cuban footballer) (born 1988), Cuban midfielder
Alberto Gómez (Uruguayan footballer) (born 1944), Uruguayan forward
Alberto Gómez (writer), creator of telenovelas such as Secreto de amor
Alberto Gómez Gómez (born 1956), Colombian–American artist
Nagore (footballer) (born 1980), birth name Alberto Gómez Fernández